Sons of Ares could refer to:
 Red Rising: Sons of Ares, a comic book series that serve as the prequel to the Red Rising science fiction novel trilogy by Pierce Brown
 Sons of Ares, a fictional religious sect featured in the "Escape Velocity" episode of Battlestar Galactica